Dr Muhammad Amjad Chaudhry is a Pakistani politician, an entrepreneur, social worker, and former Federal Minister.

Career 
He was the Federal minister for Inter Provincial Coordination during caretaker ministry of Muhammad Mian Soomro's tenure. He also served the Chairman of the political party All Pakistan Muslim League, led by the former President of Pakistan Pervez Musharraf till 2018 and also served as its secretary general as well. On 1 February 2019, he joined Pakistan Tehreek-e-Insaf and has been associated with PTI since then. After Joining PTI he is serving as central deputy secretary information and also has been appointed as Focal Person to Former Prime Minister Imran Khan on Trade Unions. His Twitter Account is (1) Dr Amjad Ch (@DrAmjadOfficial) / Twitter and Facebook page is https://www.facebook.com/drmjadpti

References

Pakistani businesspeople
Living people
Year of birth missing (living people)
Place of birth missing (living people)